Sundhausen is a municipality in the Unstrut-Hainich-Kreis district of Thuringia, Germany.

References

Unstrut-Hainich-Kreis